Lenka Kunčíková and Karolína Stuchlá were the defending champions, but they chose to participate in Bucharest instead.

Ema Burgić Bucko and Jasmina Tinjić won the title, defeating Katharina Lehnert and Anastasiya Shoshyna in the final, 7–5, 6–3.

Seeds

Draw

See also 
 2016 ITS Cup

References 
 Draw

ITS Cup - Doubles
ITS Cup